Ghost Machine is the self-titled debut album by the five-piece music group Ghost Machine. The album was released on July 26, 2005, via the band's own label Black Blood Records.

The album contains a total of 13 core tracks. There are parts on the album that are silent spaces 4 seconds in length. There are 7 tracks all of which are 11 seconds in length and feature the same random noises. Track 12 is a 4:01 remix of "God Forbid", Track 13 is a track called "Certain Things" and is 4:38 in length. Track 14, "Ripped", goes for 6:13 and is a dark ambient track that samples random noises.

Track listing
 "Intro" – 1:06
 "Headstone" – 4:08
 "Vegas Moon" – 3:55
 "God Forbid" – 3:27
 "Scarred By Happiness (L.S.D.)" – 5:22
 "Siesta Loca" – 4:08
 "What You Made Me (Ugli)" – 3:23
 "L.S.H.F." – 6:07
 "Rock in Roll" – 3:49
 "Burning Bridges" – 3:48
 "Last Stairwell" – 4:04
 "God Forbid" (Quiet Room Mix) – 4:01
 "Certain Things" – 4:38
 "Ripped" – 6:13

2005 debut albums
Ghost Machine albums
Self-released albums